Filippo Berto (born 12 February 1978) is an Italian professor and engineer.

Biography
Filippo Berto is international chair in mechanics of materials, mechanical metallurgy, fracture mechanics, fatigue, and structural integrity at the Norwegian University of Science and Technology of Trondheim, Norway, since 2016. He is well known for his works on fracture mechanics and fatigue design for which he received several prestigious international awards. He was professor of machine design at the University of Padua, Italy, between 2006 and 2015.
In 2003, Filippo Berto is graduated in Industrial Engineering at the University of Padua (Italy). After that, he completed his Ph.D. in Mechanical Engineering at the University of Florence (Italy), in 2006.

He is chairman of the technical committee ESIS TC15 on Structural Integrity of additive manufactured components of European Structural Integrity Society.
Filippo Berto received several awards and distinctions, such as Award of Merit (2018, first and only Italian awarded up to now)  and Wohler medal (2020, first and only Italian awarded up to now)  from the European Structural Integrity Society,  Paolo Lazzarin IGF Medal (2019)  from the Italian Group of Fracture, Stephen Timoshenko Fellow (2018)  given by University of Stanford (United States), CAPOCACCIA award (2013)  given by AIAS (Italy). Filippo Berto is part of the Top Italian Scientists Engineering (Italy).

He is editor-in-chief or Editor of several scientific journals, such as, Fatigue & Fracture of Engineering Materials & Structures, Material Design & Processing Communications  and Materials MDPI. In addition, he belongs to the editorial board of several leading scientific journals in the area of fatigue, fracture and structural integrity, such as, Materials & Design, International Journal of Fatigue, Safety Science, Theoretical and Applied Fracture Mechanics, Materials Science and Engineering: A, Advanced Engineering Materials, Polymer Testing, Strength of Materials, among others.
He is the founder, the head and, scientific leader of the mechanical testing laboratory at the Department of mechanical and industrial engineering in NTNU  that he has built since 2016 attracting financial support from different sources.

Filippo Berto has a major role in the Italian Group of Fracture being vice-president  since 2019 and co-editor in chief of the associated journal.

He has been visiting professor in prestigious Stanford University (United States) where is collaborating with Nanoscale Prototyping Laboratory. He is also holding some honorary chair professorship at Hong Kong Polytechnic University (Hong Kong)  and Mandela Metropolitan University (South Africa). In 2021, Filippo Berto became a Distinguished Changjiang Chair Professor at Xi'an Jiaotong University through the Changjiang Scholars Program.

He is collaborating with CERN (having an adjunct professorship) for testing and characterizing materials for The Large Hadron Collider (LHC). Prof. Filippo Berto is an adjunct professor at the prestigious Erich Schmid Institute of Materials Science, Austrian Academy of Sciences, Leoben led by Prof. Jürgen Eckert. He is also an adjunct professor at SUPSI University in Switzerland.

He is also collaborating with the Centre of Excellence of additive manufacturing established in Auburn  and in particular with Prof. Nima Shamsaei and Dr. Mohsen Seifi who is chair of additive manufacturing programs in ASTM. Filippo Berto is also voting member of ASTM F42 on Additive Manufacturing Technologies  and ASTM E08 on Metal Fatigue and Fracture.

As technical Chair of TC15 is also the founder of the series of European conferences on additive manufacturing ESIAM. He is also one of the founder of the ESIS TC18 on Structural Integrity of Welded Joints and treasurer of the same TC.
Besides, Dr. Filippo Berto is in the list of 2% top scientist released by Stanford University. In Europe, he is among the first twenty positions in the field of Mechanical Engineering and Transports and among the first 3 positions dealing with fracture and fatigue problems. He is a top author in the last 5 years (2015–2020) in several topics such as (V-notches, Strain Energy Density, T-Stress) in Scopus, where he is also among the first three top authors all-time in fatigue.
Dr. Berto has educated more than 20 PhDs students and more than 200 master students. He is among the top reviewers and top authors in 2020 in the field of structural integrity.

Filippo Berto has a close collaboration with industrial partners. It is worth of mentioning the long-term cooperation with Cimolai.

Research topics

Physical and mechanical properties of traditional and innovative metals considering multiscale effects in terms of damage and degradation 
Effect of process parameters on the mechanical properties of additively manufacture metals 
Effect of process parameters on the mechanical behaviour of innovative solid-state multi-metals weldments 
Physical and mechanical properties of traditional and innovative metals in presence of defects 
SEM/TEM characterization of crack initiation and propagation in metallic materials 
Mechanical behaviour of magnesium alloys for biomedical applications 
Hot-dip galvanization and its influence on the mechanical behaviour of metal manufacts 
Atomic layer deposition and other advanced techniques for coatings of metals 
Physical and mechanical properties of metallic weldments 
Physical and mechanical properties of pure lead used for nuclear applications (in collaboration with CERN) 
Mechanical behaviour of metals under complex loadings and environmental conditions 
Local approaches and their application to fatigue (material)

Prizes and honours
August Wöhler Medal Medal for Fatigue, European Structural Integrity Society (2020)
Structural Integrity Award of Merit, Springer Science+Business Media (2020) 
Paolo Lazzarin IGF Medal, Italian Group of Fracture (2019)
Award of Merit, European Structural Integrity Society (2018)
Stephen Timoshenko Fellow, University of Stanford (2018)
CAPOCACCIA award, AIAS (2013)

References

1978 births
Living people
Italian engineers
Academic staff of the Norwegian University of Science and Technology
University of Florence alumni
University of Padua alumni
Academic staff of the University of Padua